Spheterista reynoldsiana is a moth of the family Tortricidae. It was first described by Otto Swezey in 1920. It is endemic to the Hawaiian island of Oahu.

The larvae feed on Reynoldsia sandwicensis. The larvae are green. They spin together leaves to feed between.

Pupation takes place within these spun-together leaves. The pupa is brown and 7–10 mm long.

External links

Archipini
Endemic moths of Hawaii